Lee Hyun-seung may refer to:

Lee Hyun-seung (director) (born 1961)
Lee Hyun-seung (baseball) (born 1983)
Lee Hyun-seung (footballer) (born 1988)